Gig Morton (born March 22, 1996) is a Canadian actor and podcast host. Beginning a professional career as a child actor at age nine, Morton is a six time Young Artist Award nominee, best known for his role as B-Dawg's boy, "Billy" in four installments of the Air Buddies film franchise, Air Buddies, Snow Buddies, Space Buddies, and Santa Buddies, as well as for his co-starring role as "Derby" on the Canadian television show Mr. Young.

Early life
Gig Morton was born March 22, 1996 in Comox, British Columbia. "Gig" is Morton's given name and, when asked about where the name originated during an interview with Celebuzz, Morton explained—"It's actually my real name that's on my birth certificate. It's a funny story: when my dad was little—my dad's name is Gary—his little brother couldn't say Gary, so he called him ‘Gig’ and that became his nickname. And everyone calls him Gig besides my Nana, my dad’s mom."

Raised in Courtenay, British Columbia, Morton began acting at age seven when his sisters were doing community theatre. His mother and sisters convinced him to audition, and he ended up landing his first role in the Rainbow Youth Theatre's production of The Wizard of Oz. After discovering his love for musical theatre, Morton would go on to appear in numerous musical stage productions, including lead roles in the Vanier Senior Secondary's production of Adventures in the Forest, the Red Room Studio's production of Oliver! and the Courtenay Little Theatre's production of Peter Pan.

Career
Morton began his professional acting career in 2005 at age nine, appearing in a commercial for Save-On-Foods, and has since appeared in numerous commercials for Aviva Insurance, Kellogg's and Mattel among others. In 2006, Morton made his film debut, appearing as the boy (known in later films as "Billy") selected to adopt the golden retriever puppy, "B-Dawg" in the Disney family comedy, Air Buddies, and made his television debut the following year with a small guest-starring role on the detective series Psych.

In 2008, Morton reprised his role as "Billy" in the second installment of the Air Buddies franchise, Snow Buddies, and landed his first starring role in the black comedy short film The Escape of Conrad Lard-Bottom. Later that same year he starred in the holiday fantasy film, Christmas Town as "Mason McCann", a boy who, along with his mother, discovers a town where Santa Claus and his elves are working. These roles earned Morton a total of three Young Artist Award nominations the following year as "Best Young Actor in a DVD film" for his role as "Billy" in Snow Buddies, "Best Young Actor in a Short Film" for his role as "Conrad Lard-Bottom" in The Escape of Conrad Lard-Bottom and "Best Young Actor in a TV Movie" for his role as "Mason McCann" in Christmas Town.

In 2009, Morton appeared as "Tommy Shatterfield" in the pilot for the family television drama, Mistresses, and as "John" in the western television movie Angel and the Bad Man. That same year, he once again reprised his role as "Billy" in the third and fourth installments of the Air Buddies franchise, Space Buddies and Santa Buddies. Morton was once again recognized with two Young Artist Award nominations the following year as "Best Supporting Actor in a TV Movie" for his role as "John" in Angel and the Bad Man and as "Best Young Actor in a DVD Film" for his role as "Billy" in Santa Buddies.

In 2010, Morton guest-starred on the crime series Shattered as "Stephen Alvert", the son of a wealthy German immigrant who is being investigated for murder. His dramatic performance earned him his sixth Young Artist Award nomination the following year as "Best Young Guest-Starring Actor, age 14-17, in a TV Series". In 2011, Morton appeared in a co-starring role as "Carl", one of three travelers who share a taxi with a slacker who believes he is Jesus in the comedy short, Jesus, Chris. That same year, Morton landed a co-starring role on the teen situation comedy Mr. Young, playing "Derby", the naive, but loyal best friend to a 14-year-old boy genius, played by Brendan Meyer, who takes a job as a high school science teacher.

Morton hosts a video podcast called Gig and Erika are Kids These Days.

Personal life
Morton resides in Vancouver, British Columbia. He attended school on the set of Mr. Young alongside his fellow co-stars Brendan Meyer and Matreya Fedor. At age ten, after discovering his passion for musical theatre and dance, Morton began taking performance arts classes, studying acting, singing, guitar, hip-hop dancing, tap dancing and ballet. Morton's hobbies and activities include swimming, skateboarding, fencing, biking, soccer, basketball, trampoline, yo-yo tricks, video games, and robot building.

Filmography

Awards

References

External links
Website
 
 Gig Morton on Facebook
 

1996 births
21st-century Canadian male actors
Canadian male child actors
Canadian male film actors
Canadian male stage actors
Canadian male television actors
Canadian male voice actors
Living people
Male actors from British Columbia
People from Comox, British Columbia